Blaine is a suburban city in Anoka and Ramsey counties in the State of Minnesota, United States. Once a rural town, Blaine's population has increased significantly in the last 60 years. For several years, Blaine led the Twin Cities metro region in new home construction. The population was 70,222 at the 2020 census. The city is located mainly in Anoka County, and is part of the Minneapolis–Saint Paul metropolitan area.

Interstate 35W, U.S. Highway 10, and Minnesota State Highway 65 are three of the main routes in the city.

History
Phillip Leddy, a native of Ireland, was recorded in the 1857 census as having settled in the township of Anoka until his death in 1872, on land that later became Blaine. In 1862, he moved near a lake that now bears his misspelled name, Laddie Lake. Another early settler was the Englishman George Townsend, who lived for a short time near what today is Lever St. and 103rd Ave.

It was not until 1865 that Blaine's first permanent resident, Greenberry Chambers, settled on the old Townsend claim. Chambers was a former slave who moved north from Barren County, Kentucky, after the American Civil War. Around 1884, Chambers and his family moved to St. Paul.

In 1870, George Wall, Joseph Gagner, and others soon settled in the area and it began to grow.

In 1877, Blaine separated from Anoka and organized as a township of its own. That year the first election was held and Moses Ripley was elected the first Chairman of the Board of Supervisors. By 1880, Blaine's population had reached 128.

While many other Anoka County communities experienced growth due to farming, Blaine's sandy soil and abundant wetlands discouraged farmers and it remained a prime hunting area. Blaine's growth remained slow until after World War II, when housing developments began in the southern part of town and the community became more suburban. Blaine's population has grown from 1,694 in 1950 to 20,573 in 1970 to 57,186 in 2010 to 70,222 in 2020. By 2022, the population was over 72,000.

Furthermore, the land development technique of sand mining opened thousands of acres of peat sod farms up for development. Beginning with the development of the Knoll Creek, Club West, Pleasure Creek and TPC Twin Cities, the existing land was modified through extensive grading efforts with the result in the large open water areas. The sand from the excavation of those ponds was used to raise the level of the site. These site modifications are needed to accommodate the development of the homes and neighborhoods. The success of mining sand allowed for further development in the city. The centerpiece of those developments is The Lakes of Blaine. Corporate residents include the Aveda Corporation, Infinite Campus, PTC Inc, MagnetStreet, the parking lot portion of a Medtronic Development, and Dayton Rogers Manufacturing.

Geography

Blaine can be accessed from several major roadways in the Twin Cities, including Minnesota State Highway 65, Interstate 35W, University Avenue, Lexington Avenue, Hamline Avenue, U.S. Highway 10 and Minnesota State Highway 610.

Major landforms
The Blaine area was covered by a large glacier that shaped the landscape during the late Wisconsinan glaciation. The land used to be covered by river valleys 200 feet deep. The valleys filled with sediment. One valley ran northeast to southwest under Lino Lakes. As the glaciers retreated, the water gathered into a lake that covered much of Anoka County. Huge ice chunks were left in the glacier's wake. They melted and formed depressions that filled with water. This became the chain of lakes between Lino Lakes and Circle Pines.

There are four major named water bodies partially or completely within the city limits. Sunrise Lake as part of The Lakes housing development is the largest body at 158 acres in size, and going down to depths of near 40 feet in some places. The next largest body is Laddie Lake, the only naturally occurring lake in Blaine, which is also partially in Spring Lake Park at 77 acres in size, reaching maximum depth of 6 ft in some locations. The next largest body is Club West Lake at 39 acres and depths up to 25 ft, also man-made, located in the Club West Housing development. The last named body of water in the city is Loch Ness; at 11 acres in size it is managed by the city and has a provided fishing dock. There are several other large bodies of water within the city that are not classified as lakes found around the TPC of the Twin Cities, Pleasure Creek Neighborhood, Knoll Creek Development, Crescent Ponds.

Blaine is also in the process of creating a 500-acre open space plan. The city started acquiring portions of the property in the late 1990s, but most of it was acquired after Blaine voters approved a $3.5 million referendum in 2000. A tentative long-range plan calls for the construction of a nature center by 2020.  The 70-acre Kane Meadows Park also acquired next to The Lakes development has been the centerpiece of this open space program.

Demographics

2010 census
As of the census of 2010, there were 57,186 people, 21,077 households, and 15,423 families living in the city. The racial makeup of the city was 84.0% White, 3.7% African American, 0.5% Native American, 7.8% Asian, 1.2% from other races, and 2.7% from two or more races. Hispanic or Latino of any race were 3.2% of the population.

There were 21,077 households, of which 38.3% had children under the age of 18 living with them, 57.8% were married couples living together, 10.8% had a female householder with no husband present, 4.6% had a male householder with no wife present, and 26.8% were non-families. 20.7% of all households were made up of individuals, and 5.7% had someone living alone who was 65 years of age or older. The average household size was 2.71 and the average family size was 3.14.

The median age in the city was 35.6 years. 26.5% of residents were under the age of 18; 7.4% were between the ages of 18 and 24; 30.7% were from 25 to 44; 27% were from 45 to 64; and 8.5% were 65 years of age or older. The gender makeup of the city was 49.1% male and 50.9% female.

2000 census
As of the census of 2000, there were 44,942 people, 15,898 households, and 12,177 families living in the city. The racial makeup of the city was 93.46% White, 0.86% African American, 0.63% Native American, 2.54% Asian, 0.02% Pacific Islander, 0.75% from other races, and 1.75% from two or more races. 1.72% of the population were Hispanic or Latino of any race.

There were 15,898 households, out of which 41.1% had children under the age of 18 living with them, 61.1% were married couples living together, 11.1% had a female householder with no husband present, and 23.4% were non-families. 17.0% of all households were made up of individuals, and 3.3% had someone living alone who was 65 years of age or older. The average household size was 2.82 and the average family size was 3.19.

In the city, the population was spread out, with 29.1% under the age of 18, 8.7% from 18 to 24, 34.8% from 25 to 44, 22.0% from 45 to 64, and 5.3% who were 65 years of age or older. The median age was 33 years. For every 100 females, there were 100.2 males. For every 100 females age 18 and over, there were 98.1 males.

The median income for a household in the city was $59,219, and the median income for a family was $63,831. Males had a median income of $40,620 versus $30,452 for females. The per capita income for the city was $22,777. 3.0% of the population and 2.1% of families were below the poverty line. Out of the total population, 3.0% of those under the age of 18 and 3.7% of those 65 and older were living below the poverty line.

Economy

Top employers
According to the City's 2020 Comprehensive Annual Financial Report, the largest employers in the city are:

Sports
The 3M Open, a PGA Tour event held at TPC Twin Cities.

The National Sports Center was the home of Minnesota's professional soccer teams for 23 years. From 1990 to 2003 and 2008–2009 the National Sports Center was home for the now defunct Minnesota Thunder. After the Thunder folded, the sports center quickly stepped in and created the NSC Minnesota Stars for the 2009 season. The United States Soccer Federation ruled the stadium could not own the team, due to an increase in financial standards the stadium did not have, and the team re-branded to become the Minnesota Stars FC for the 2010–2012 seasons. The Minnesota United FC, after being re-branded in early 2013 to represent the history of soccer in Minnesota, played at the National Sports Center until their promotion to Major League Soccer in 2017, and they now play at Allianz Field in St. Paul but continue to use the National Sports Center as their training facility.

The National Sports Center is also home to Victory Links Golf Course, a stadium with an artificial turf field, over 50 full-size soccer fields, an eight-sheet ice arena, the largest of its kind in the world, an expo center, and a meeting and convention facility.

Parks and recreation
The City of Blaine has 66 parks and hundreds of miles of trails. Its parks include Aquartore Park, Happy Acres Park, Lexington Athletic Complex, the Blaine Baseball Complex, and Lakeside Commons Park. The Blaine Wetland Sanctuary is 500 acres of protected open space featuring a boardwalk and trails.

Government
2021-2024 Blaine City Council:
Mayor: Tim Sanders
Ward One Councilmembers: Jason Smith and Wes Hovland
Ward Two Councilmembers: Julie Jeppson and Jess Robertson
Ward Three Councilmembers: Chris Massoglia and Richard Paul

Blaine is in Minnesota's 6th congressional district, represented by Tom Emmer, a Republican. Its U.S. Senators are Amy Klobuchar and Tina Smith, both Democrats. Blaine is represented by Nolan West and Erin Koegel in the Minnesota House of Representatives, and Jerry Newton in the Minnesota Senate.

Education
Blaine is served by three different school districts. The Anoka-Hennepin School District covers most of the city, from Highway 65 west to University Ave north of 99th Ave NE and the areas north of Cloud Drive, and zigzags through the Lakes neighborhood up to Main Street, where it covers everything north all the way across to Sunset, the city's eastern edge. The Spring Lake Park School District covers nearly everything south of 99th Ave NE, the east side of Highway 65 north to where it bumps into District 11 and east to Lexington, where it bumps into the Centennial School District. District 12—Centennial Schools—covers east of Lexington almost up to Main Street and everything south and east of Interstate 35W.

There are three high schools within the city: Blaine High School in the Anoka-Hennepin School District, Centennial High School in the Centennial School District, and Paladin Career and Technical High School, a public charter school. In addition, some Blaine students attend Spring Lake Park High School in the Spring Lake Park School District.

Rasmussen University, a private, for-profit school offering bachelor's and associate degrees, has a location in Blaine.

References

External links

 
Cities in Minnesota
Cities in Anoka County, Minnesota
Cities in Ramsey County, Minnesota
Populated places established in 1862
1862 establishments in Minnesota